Shatru Sanghar, is a 2009 Indian Odia film directed by Sudhansu Sahu. This is Pine Cask's second film after the debacle of Anubhav Mohanty's Mahanayak. and was profitable Second highest Grossing film of 2009.

Synopsis 
Ajay Patnaik's main aim is to become a boxing champion. He does goes for training to Visakhapatnam, but when he return he found that his elder brother, Bijay Patnik is missing since one month. Ajay searches every corner for his brother but no result. He loges a police complaint, still no result at last Bijay's corpse is found and Ajay is charged with killing him. After escape from jail with his friends, Ajay takes revenge and punishes the culprit Nagbhusan and Nilambar.

Cast 
Siddhanta Mahapatra as Bijay Patnaik
Akash Dasnayak as Ajay  
Shriya Jha as Deepa
Samapika Debnath as Jyoti
Rahul Dev as Rahul
Ashru Mochon Mohanty as Nagabhusan
Mihir Das as Police DCP
Bijay Mohanty as Nilambar Das
Bobby Misra 
Prabir Sasmal 
Saheb Singh 
Sanjay Nayak
Rudranil Chatterjee
Initially Anubhav Mohanty was signed to play the hero of the film, but he opted out due to date problems.

References

External links 
 

2009 films
Indian action films
Odia remakes of Hindi films
2000s Odia-language films
2009 action films
Films directed by Sudhanshu Sahu